Sir Robert Payne (29 September 1573 – 18 June 1631) was an English landowner and politician who sat in the House of Commons at various times between 1614 and 1629.

Biography 
Robert Payne was the son of Robert Payne of Midloe, Huntingtonshire and his wife Maria Watertown, daughter of Sir Robert Watertown of Waterton, Yorkshire. In 1603 he inherited the estate of Midloe on the death of his father. He was knighted at Greenwich on  22 May 1605.  In 1607 he was High Sheriff of Cambridgeshire and Huntingdonshire. He was a subscriber of the London Virginia Company in 1609.   In 1614, Payne was elected Member of Parliament for Huntingdonshire. He was re-elected MP for Huntingdonshire in 1621.  In 1626 he was elected MP for Huntingdonshire again. He was re-elected in 1628 and sat until 1629 when King Charles decided to rule without parliament for eleven years.

Payne died at the age of aged 58.

Personal life 
Payne married Elizabeth Rotheram, the daughter of George Rotheram of Somery, Bedfordshire and had 5 sons and 6 daughters.

References

 

1573 births
1631 deaths
English MPs 1614
English MPs 1621–1622
English MPs 1626
English MPs 1628–1629
High Sheriffs of Cambridgeshire and Huntingdonshire
Politics of Huntingdonshire